Lost Songs may refer to:

 Lost Songs (Anberlin album)
 Lost Songs (...And You Will Know Us By the Trail of Dead album)
 Lost Songs (New Model Army album)
 Lost Songs (The Appleseed Cast album)
 Lost Songs 95–98, an album by David Gray
 Lost Songs of 1936, an album by Bucky Pizzarelli, Dick Hyman, and Jay Leonhart
 The Lost Songs, a song collection by McFly

See also
Lost Song (disambiguation)